Megacraspedus tutti is a moth of the family Gelechiidae. It was described by Walsingham in 1887. It is found in France.

The forewings are mouse-grey, with very faint indications of paler lines following the neuration. These are scarcely distinguishable except along the upper margin of the cell. The costa is narrowly whitish from the base to the middle of the costal cilia. The hindwings are pale-grey.

References

Moths described in 1887
Megacraspedus